In the mathematical fields of Riemannian and pseudo-Riemannian geometry, the Ricci decomposition is a way of breaking up the Riemann curvature tensor of a Riemannian or pseudo-Riemannian manifold into pieces with special algebraic properties.  This decomposition is of fundamental importance in Riemannian and pseudo-Riemannian geometry.

Definition of the decomposition
Let (M,g) be a Riemannian or pseudo-Riemannian n-manifold. Consider its Riemann curvature, as a (0,4)-tensor field. This article will follow the sign convention

written multilinearly, this is the convention

With this convention, the Ricci tensor is a (0,2)-tensor field defined by Rjk=gilRijkl and the scalar curvature is defined by R=gjkRjk. (Note that this is the less common sign convention for the Ricci tensor; it is more standard to define it by contracting either the first and third or the second and fourth indices, which yields a Ricci tensor with the opposite sign. Under that more common convention, the signs of the Ricci tensor and scalar must be changed in the equations below.) Define the traceless Ricci tensor

and then define three (0,4)-tensor fields S, E, and W by

The "Ricci decomposition" is the statement

As stated, this is vacuous since it is just a reorganization of the definition of W. The importance of the decomposition is in the properties of the three new tensors S, E, and W.

Terminological note. The tensor W is called the Weyl tensor. The notation W is standard in mathematics literature, while C is more common in physics literature. The notation R is standard in both, while there is no standardized notation for S, Z, and E.

Basic properties

Properties of the pieces
Each of the tensors S, E, and W has the same algebraic symmetries as the Riemann tensor. That is:

together with

The Weyl tensor has the additional symmetry that it is completely traceless:

Hermann Weyl showed that W has the remarkable property of measuring the deviation of a Riemannian or pseudo-Riemannian manifold from local conformal flatness; if it is zero, then M can be covered by charts relative to which g has the form gij=efδij for some function f defined chart by chart.

Properties of the decomposition
One may check that the Ricci decomposition is orthogonal in the sense that

recalling the general definition  This has the consequence, which could be proved directly, that

Terminological note. It would be symbolically clean to present this orthogonality as saying

together with

However, there is an unavoidable ambiguity with such notation depending on whether one views  as multilinear maps  or as linear maps  in which case the corresponding norms and inner products would differ by a constant factor. Although this would not lead to any inconsistencies in the above equations, since all terms would be changed by the same factor, it can lead to confusion in more involved contexts. For this reason, the index notation can often be easier to understand.

Related formulas
One can compute the "norm formulas"

and the "trace formulas"

Mathematical explanation of the decomposition
Mathematically, the Ricci decomposition is the decomposition of the space of all tensors having the symmetries of the Riemann tensor into its irreducible representations for the action of the orthogonal group .  Let V be an n-dimensional vector space, equipped with a metric tensor (of possibly mixed signature).  Here V is modeled on the cotangent space at a point, so that a curvature tensor R (with all indices lowered) is an element of the tensor product V⊗V⊗V⊗V.  The curvature tensor is skew symmetric in its first and last two entries:

and obeys the interchange symmetry

for all x,y,z,w ∈ V∗. As a result, R is an element of the subspace , the second symmetric power of the second exterior power of V.  A curvature tensor must also satisfy the Bianchi identity, meaning that it is in the kernel of the linear map  given by

The space  in S2Λ2V is the space of algebraic curvature tensors.  The Ricci decomposition is the decomposition of this space into irreducible factors.  The Ricci contraction mapping

is given by

This associates a symmetric 2-form to an algebraic curvature tensor.  Conversely, given a pair of symmetric 2-forms h and k, the Kulkarni–Nomizu product of h and k

produces an algebraic curvature tensor.

If n > 4, then there is an orthogonal decomposition into (unique) irreducible subspaces

where
, where  is the space of real scalars
, where SV is the space of trace-free symmetric 2-forms

The parts S, E, and C of the Ricci decomposition of a given Riemann tensor R are the orthogonal projections of R onto these invariant factors.  In particular,

is an orthogonal decomposition in the sense that

This decomposition expresses the space of tensors with Riemann symmetries as a direct sum of the scalar submodule, the Ricci submodule, and Weyl submodule, respectively.  Each of these modules is an irreducible representation for the orthogonal group , and thus the Ricci decomposition is a special case of the splitting of a module for a semisimple Lie group into its irreducible factors.  In dimension 4, the Weyl module decomposes further into a pair of irreducible factors for the special orthogonal group: the self-dual and antiself-dual parts W+ and W−.

Physical interpretation
The Ricci decomposition can be interpreted physically in Einstein's theory of general relativity, where it is sometimes called the Géhéniau-Debever decomposition. In this theory, the Einstein field equation

where  is the stress–energy tensor describing the amount and motion of all matter and all nongravitational field energy and momentum, states that the Ricci tensor—or equivalently, the Einstein tensor—represents that part of the gravitational field which is due to the immediate presence of nongravitational energy and momentum.  The Weyl tensor represents the part of the gravitational field which can propagate as a gravitational wave through a region containing no matter or nongravitational fields.  Regions of spacetime in which the Weyl tensor vanishes contain no gravitational radiation and are also conformally flat.

See also

Bel decomposition of the Riemann tensor
Conformal geometry
Petrov classification
Plebanski tensor
Ricci calculus
Schouten tensor
Trace-free Ricci tensor

References
.
 .  Section 6.1 discusses the decomposition.  Versions of the decomposition also enter into the discussion of conformal and projective geometries, in chapters 7 and 8.
 .

Differential geometry
Riemannian geometry
Tensors in general relativity